Hemimetabolism or hemimetaboly, also called incomplete metamorphosis and paurometabolism, is the mode of development of certain insects that includes three distinct stages: the egg, nymph, and the adult stage, or imago. These groups go through gradual changes; there is no pupal stage. The nymph often has a thin exoskeleton and resembles the adult stage but lacks wings and functional reproductive organs. The hemimetabolous insects differ from ametabolous taxa in that the one and only adult instar undergoes no further moulting.

Orders
All insects of the Pterygota except Holometabola belong to hemimetabolous orders:
Hemiptera (scale insects, aphids, whitefly, cicadas, leafhoppers, and true bugs)
Orthoptera (grasshoppers, locusts, and crickets)
Mantodea (praying mantises)
Blattodea (cockroaches and termites)
Dermaptera (earwigs)
Odonata (dragonflies and damselflies)
Phasmatodea (stick insects)
Phthiraptera (sucking lice)
Ephemeroptera (mayflies)
Plecoptera (stoneflies)
Notoptera (icebugs and gladiators)

Terminology of aquatic entomology
In aquatic entomology, different terminology is used when categorizing insects with incomplete metamorphosis. Paurometabolism refers to insects whose nymphs occupy the same environment as the adults, as in the family Gerridae of Hemiptera. The hemimetabolous insects are those whose nymphs, called naiads, occupy aquatic habitats while the adults are terrestrial. This includes all members of the orders Plecoptera, Ephemeroptera, and Odonata. Aquatic entomologists use this categorization because it specifies whether the adult will occupy an aquatic or semi aquatic habitat, or will be terrestrial. This classification system is similar to previously used nomenclature in terrestrial entomology.

See also
Holometabolism
Subimago
Metamorphosis

References

Insect developmental biology

he:בעלי גלגול חסר
simple:Incomplete metamorphosis